Red Lake is an ephemeral salt lake in the outback of Western Australia.

The lake is part of a chain of lakes with Blue Lake to the north, Brown Lake to the south west and White Lake and Douglas Lake to the north east.

References

Lakes of Goldfields-Esperance (Western Australia)
Saline lakes of Western Australia